A debtor in possession or DIP in United States bankruptcy law is a person or corporation who has filed a bankruptcy petition, but remains in possession of property upon which a creditor has a lien or similar security interest. A debtor becomes the debtor in possession after filing the bankruptcy petition. A corporation which continues to operate its business under Chapter 11 bankruptcy proceedings is a debtor in possession.

Under certain circumstances, the debtor in possession may be able to keep the property by paying the creditor the fair market value, as opposed to the contract price. For example, where the property is a personal vehicle which has depreciated since the time of the purchase, and which the debtor needs to find or continue employment to pay off his debts, the debtor may pay the creditor for the fair market value of the car to keep it.

See also
Debtor-in-possession financing
Seniority (financial)
Bail out (finance)
Default (finance)
Distressed securities
Insolvency
Liquidation
Bankruptcy alternatives

Notes

United States bankruptcy law